Grapevine Commercial Historic District is located in Grapevine, Texas.

It was added to the National Register on March 9, 1992.

Photo gallery

See also
 Historic districts in the United States
 National Register of Historic Places listings in Tarrant County, Texas

References

External links
 
  
  
 

National Register of Historic Places in Tarrant County, Texas
Historic districts in Tarrant County, Texas
Grapevine, Texas
Historic districts on the National Register of Historic Places in Texas